Miljard may refer to:

 109, see Long and short scales
 Miljard (album), an album by Circle